Mardik Martin (September 16, 1934 – September 11, 2019) was an American screenwriter of such classics as Mean Streets, New York, New York and Raging Bull directed by his lifelong friend Martin Scorsese and starring Robert De Niro. Mardik Martin is among the revered screenwriters on Writers Guild of America list of 101 Greatest Screenplays.

Early life
Martin Mardik was born into a family of Armenian genocide survivors that fled to Iran. They later moved to Iraq. Although his family in Iraq was wealthy, he fled the country to avoid the draft and arrived in New York City in a penniless state.

Later life and career
In Easy Riders, Raging Bulls, Peter Biskind’s 1998 book on the New Hollywood, the author writes that Martin had to wash dishes to pay his way through NYU, where he met fellow student Martin Scorsese in 1961. The two formed a close friendship and worked together on Scorsese's early projects such as It's Not Just You, Murray! and the semi-autobiographical Season of the Witch, which ultimately became Mean Streets. According to Biskind, "The two young men sat in Martin's Plymouth Valiant and wrote. In the winter, in the cold and snow." Martin also shared writing credits on the Scorsese films New York, New York (with Earl Mac Rauch) and Raging Bull (with Paul Schrader).

In 2014, Martin co-wrote the screenplay of the German drama The Cut, which won a special mention by the Young Jury Members of the Vittorio Veneto Film Festival for its director Fatih Akin at the 2014 Venice Film Festival.

Death
Martin died of unknown causes on September 11, 2019. He was found dead in his house five days short of his 85th birthday.

Awards
In 2012, Martin was honored the Parajanov-Vartanov Institute "for the mastery of his pen on iconic American films" such as Mean Streets and Raging Bull.

Filmography

References

Further reading
 Easy Riders, Raging Bulls (1998), by Peter Biskind (Chapter Eight: The Gospel According to St. Martin)

1934 births
2019 deaths
American male screenwriters
American people of Armenian descent
Iranian people of Armenian descent
Iraqi emigrants to the United States
Tisch School of the Arts alumni